Doha Asian Games may refer to two different Asian Games held in Doha:

 2006 Asian Games
 2030 Asian Games, future event